The Kimmel Center for the Performing Arts is a large performing arts venue at 300 South Broad Street and the corner of Spruce Street, along the stretch known as the Avenue of the Arts in Center City Philadelphia, Pennsylvania. It is owned and operated by Kimmel Cultural Center, which also manages the Academy of Music in Philadelphia, and, as of November 2016, the Miller Theater. The center is named after philanthropist Sidney Kimmel.

The center is the home of the Philadelphia Orchestra, one of America's "Big Five" symphony orchestras. It is also the home venue of the Philadelphia Youth Orchestra, Chamber Orchestra of Philadelphia, Philadanco, the Philadelphia Chamber Music Society, and the Kimmel Center Presents performance series, which features a variety of jazz, classical, and world pop performers.

History
In 1986, the Philadelphia Orchestra approved a plan to construct a new concert hall to replace the aging Academy of Music.  It hoped to complete the new facility in time for its 1991 season.  The desire to move the orchestra from its facilities in the Academy of Music emerged as early as 1908, however plans stalled due to the lack of consensus on the project's scope and funding.  They were revived again in the 1920s only to be scuttled by the Great Depression.  Plans emerged again shortly after World War II when performing arts centers were constructed in other cities such as New York, Washington and Los Angeles. Despite the 1986 commitment, the project languished until 1993 when Sidney Kimmel donated $12 million to the project and in 1995, Orchestra and community leaders met to help revitalize the concert hall and also discussed merging it with a venue to house other area organizations and visiting artists. The two projects were officially merged as the Regional Performing Arts Center in 1996 and construction began in 1998.  In 2000, the center was named for Sidney Kimmel in recognition of his gift in 1993 and an additional $3 million donation in 1998. The concert hall was named Verizon Hall to recognize contributions totaling $14.5 million in cash, equipment and services from Verizon and the Verizon Foundation.

The architect of the center was Rafael Viñoly, and the acoustician was Artec Consultants. The Kimmel Center officially opened in an unfinished state on December 16, 2001.  This followed a gala preview on December 14 featuring performances by André Watts, Denyce Graves, Frederica von Stade and Sir Elton John and the Philadelphia Orchestra premiere at Verizon Hall on December 15.  Numerous cost overruns and construction delays led to the filing of a lawsuit in 2005 by officials of the Kimmel Center against Viñoly.  The lawsuit was settled for an undisclosed sum in 2006.

Performance and other facilities
A distinctive vaulted glass ceiling encloses the entire structure providing a large common lobby for all the facilities. The center is a popular attraction, keeping its doors open to the public seven days a week. It hosts thousands of visitors annually and offers free tours of the facility regularly.

 Verizon Hall, with 2,500 seats, is the main performance auditorium. It contains a pipe organ by Dobson Pipe Organ Builders, which is the largest mechanical action pipe organ in an American concert hall. The organ is Dobson's Opus 76 and is named for Fred J. Cooper.  It has two consoles with four manuals, 97 ranks and 124 stops.
 Perelman Theater, with 650 seats, has a -diameter turntable stage that permits the space to be used as a recital hall or a proscenium theater with a stage, fly-loft and orchestra pit.
 Dorrance H. Hamilton Roof Garden located above the Perelman Theater.
 SEI Innovation Studio, a  black box theater located on the lower levels of the Kimmel Center.
 Smaller performance spaces and meeting rooms.

Other noteworthy programs
The Kimmel Center offers a variety of other programs besides concerts, specifically in the field of education. The Kimmel Center is home to its own Youth Jazz Orchestra called The Kimmel Center Youth Jazz Ensemble (KCYJE). This Ensemble includes many youth jazz musicians in the Philadelphia/New Jersey Area. The Ensemble is recognized as a youth version of the Lincoln Center Jazz Orchestra.

Additionally, The Kimmel Center holds a Teen Summer Arts Camp annually where it offers ten-day programs in chamber music, choral/vocal music, and jazz.

Gallery

See also

 List of concert halls

References
Notes

External links

 Official website
 Kimmel Center Blog
 Philadelphia Orchestra website
 Ticket Philadelphia website

Buildings and structures in Philadelphia
Culture of Philadelphia
Rafael Viñoly buildings
Performing arts centers in Pennsylvania
Music venues in Philadelphia
Tourist attractions in Philadelphia
Center City, Philadelphia